WSWV-FM is a Country and Bluegrass-formatted broadcast radio station licensed to Pennington Gap, Virginia, serving the Pennington Gap/Big Stone Gap/Jonesville area. WSWV-FM is owned by Roger Bouldin, through licensee Bouldin Radio, LLC.

References

External links
 FM 105.5 WSWV Online
 

SWV-FM
Country radio stations in the United States
Radio stations established in 1973
1973 establishments in Virginia